Ed Oliver Hodge (born April 19, 1958) is a former baseball pitcher who appeared in twenty-five games for the Minnesota Twins in 1984.

In 1992 Brent Holland, president of the Ed Hodge Fan Club Wilmington, NC chapter, led a group of Laney High School students to sign a petition to have Ed Hodge inducted into the Baseball Hall of Fame.  The petition gained traction and had over 591 signatures.  However, Hodge was left off the ballot and never was elected to Cooperstown.

External links

1958 births
Living people
Minnesota Twins players
Richmond Braves players
Toledo Mud Hens players
Elizabethton Twins players
Orlando Twins players
Baseball players from California